The Level (sometimes referred to as Colby Level or simply Level) (Manx: Yn Laare) is a seasonally operated request stop on the Isle of Man Railway located in the sheading of Rushen on the Isle of Man. This is the sole remaining section of the railway which once spanned over 46 miles with lines to Peel in the west, Ramsey in the north and the mining village of Foxdale in the centre of the island.

Origins
The crossing point was established with the opening of the line on 1 August 1874 where the railway bisected a small road between the main Colby to Port Erin Road and the coast road passing the nearby Kentraugh House; it became an unofficial stopping place for the local populace shortly afterwards and by 1877 plans had been made to provide a substantial crossing keepers' hut which was later accompanied by a keepers' lodge house.  The surrounding rural area grew although initially the stop was not mentioned officially in any timetable literature.

Locale
This diminutive request stop serves the hamlets or individual houses of Level (Rushen), Croit-E-Caley, Kentraugh, Ballagawie  and Ballakillowey. The 1 km section of line from the previous station (Colby) is straight and has a level crossing for Kentraugh Farm in the centre of it; to the west, towards Port St Mary, the line curves to the left on the approach to the next crossing for Ballagawne Farm and continues to Four Roads crossing.  In more recent times a housing estate called Strawberry Field has been established a short distance from the halt, this was installed by the local authority.  Until recently the road that leads to the level crossing also served the local Level Garage and until well into the 1990s trains carried motor parts from Douglas for dropping off at this point; the garage was closed in 2000 and the site has since been redeveloped into residential housing.  The village that has built up around the level crossing site has been expanded considerably since the arrival of the railway making the halt frequently utilised during the summer months.  A large private residential dwelling was established directly behind the station site from 2004 and this now dominates the railway premises with tall conifer trees; the area is now somewhat more residential than before.

Naming Origin
The title is believed to derive from the once prolific mining activity in the surrounding area, being a reference to the "level" of one of the mine adits; the mine ruins are still discernible in the hills directly above the area.  It is one of two areas that carry the colloquial name, the other being Level Rushen, although the two are often confused as they are in the same sheading of the island.  The name was adopted by the railway when the site officially became a request stop as early as 1928 when it first appeared in the timetable.  Today the painted running-in board declares the halt as The Level (bilingual since 2008  to include the Yn Laare translation into the gaelic) but in the past it has been variously called Colby Level, Level, Level (Rushen) etc., and a metal nameboard stating Colby Level - Crossing installed in 1973 remained in place until 2013; the timetable uses "The Level" in all literature.  The origin of the name comes from the stretch of main road at the top of the lane that leads from the level crossing, being a straight level section when macadamed, the name being used in local parlance ever since.  The halt is usually timetabled in the railway's literature but the 2011 timetable for example omits to give the stopping places; the halt however remains open as a request stop despite this.  It is also called the level due to the adit level at Colby, as part of the Ballacorkish mine near Colby.  Today, all references to "Colby" are removed from timetabling literature in order to avoid confusion with Colby Station itself which is a mandatory stopping place whereas The Level remains a request stop only.

Crossing
The gated crossing was manned by a dedicated gatekeeper who lived in the adjacent house; latterly when the railway's operation became seasonal a part-time member of staff would man the crossing until the installation of automatic barriers which were introduced in 2002 and the manually operated gates removed. Since then the crossing keeper's hut has been unmanned but remains in situ housing storage facilities for the railway out of season.  At that time a section of raised platform, of just one coach length, was also installed at the request of a regular passenger.  The dwelling that lies opposite the crossing lodge was once the gatekeepers' house, though this was sold off by the railway in 1972.

Restoration & Listing 2013
In February 2013 the crossing lodge and its environs were restored by volunteers from the Isle of Man Steam Railway Supporters' Association, the only charity dedicated to the continued restoration and operation of the railway; the project marked a return to active "hands-on" railway volunteering by the group after a considerable break for a number of reasons.  The lodge was restored, new period signage fitted and the surrounding area smartened up, the opportunity also being taken to standardise the naming (see above) so that all literature and notices refer to it as "The Level" rather than any of the previous connotations used.  This name was chosen following historical research into contemporary documentation which shows this as the most-used title for the request stop over many years.  Further projects by this group have included similar works at other wayside locations such as Four Roads and Mill Road, as well as their work base in the goods shed at Castletown Station.  In 2013 the building was successfully added to the island's list of protected buildings, being one of very few such crossing lodges remaining and deemed to be of historical and cultural significance; other buildings along the line are being similarly treated thanks to the endeavours of local preservationists.  Similar structures at Four Roads, Ballagawne and Ballasalla have had similar applications made on the grounds of their historical importance, as well as several of the main stations, notably Castletown and Port St. Mary.

Further Refurbishment 2020
In a follow up to their initial works in 2013, volunteers from the Isle of Man Steam Railway Supporters' Association revisited the site following easement of Covid-19 restrictions in July 2020 and once again repaired and repainted the diminutive halt, opting for a uniform maroon appearance and working in conjunction with the island's Department of Infrastructure to ensure some deteriorating woodwork was replaced; the opportunity was also taken to add some traditional railway concrete plant pots along the platform and replace the station's running in board which was time-expired.  Local residents also tend to the floral displays on the platform which were expanded upon for the 2021 season.

Routes

See also
 Isle of Man Railway stations
 Colby, Isle of Man

References

 James I.C. Boyd Isle Of Man Railway, Volume 3, The Routes & Rolling Stock (1996) 
 Norman Jones Scenes from the Past: Isle of Man Railway (1994) 
 Robert Hendry Rails in the Isle of Man: A Colour Celebration (1993) 
 A.M Goodwyn Manx Transport Kaleidoscope, 2nd Edition (1995)

External links 
 The Level
 Isle Of Man Guide
 Online Reference Guide

Railway stations in the Isle of Man
Railway stations opened in 1874